Augustiner-Bräu is a brewery in Munich, Germany. Established in 1328, it is Munich's oldest independent brewery. The company is owned by the Edith Haberland Wagner Trust 51% and the Inselkammer-Family 49%.

History 
The Augustiner Brewery was first mentioned by name in 1328, established within an Augustianian Monastery which had been settled just outside the Munich city walls in an area called Haberfeld (or Haferfeld – "oat field") in 1294. The Monastery complex was the largest sacred building in Munich until the completion of the Frauenkirche cathedral in 1494.  The Augustinian monks supplied beer to the Bavarian Royal Wittelsbach family until 1589, at which time the Hofbräu brewery was founded.

In 1759, the Augustinian Monks of Munich were among the first members of the Bavarian Academy of Sciences and Humanities. Meanwhile, during this era, Augustiner's annual output reached 250,000 liters, three times the amount of an average brewery of the time.

In 1803, as part of a secularization movement, the monastery was dissolved, and the brewery was run by the state before passing into private ownership. Then in 1817, as the original building had fallen in great disrepair, the brewery was moved to Neuhauser Straße.

Anton and Therese Wagner, a brewing family from the vicinity of neighboring Freising acquired the enterprise and the brewery has continued to be privately owned since. Around 1840, Anton Wagner acquired a storage facility on Rosenheimer Straße in order to expand the brewery and after Anton's death in 1845, his widow Therese Wagner ran the business.

Augustiner entered the industrial age in 1852 with the adoption of a steam engine to aid in production. Then in 1857, a further storage facility was acquired on Landsberger Straße, and eventually all production was moved to the new site, while a brewery-sponsored restaurant continued operation at the Neuhauser Straße location.

Joseph Wagner ("JW" as marked on the current label), took on the management role following his mother's death. The brewery further expanded in 1862 with the addition of another storage cellar at Arnulfstraße 52, the current site of the famous Augustiner-Keller and Beer Garden.

In 1880, Joseph Wagner was recognized as a founding member of the Bavarian Beer alliance, and later in 1887, Augustiner's iconic "JW" trademark with the bishop's staff was registered.

As a result of the aerial bombing of Munich during World War II, Augustiner Brewery was 60% destroyed. In 1971, the brew house was completely renovated, adopting the use of stainless steel tanks.

In 1996, Edith Haberland Wagner, the last of the Wagner dynasty, bequeathed her share in the brewery ownership to the Edith Haberland Wagner Foundation, and the foundation continues to hold 51% of the shares of the brewery to this day.

In 2013, Augustiner opened the Klosterwirt, returning to their origins on the site of the original Augustinian Monastery, just next to the Munich Frauenkirche.

Augustiner at Oktoberfest 

It is not known when Augustiner beer was first featured at the Oktoberfest, but the first record of an Augustiner beer stall is featured on a picture dating from 1867.  The first appearance of an Augustiner beer "castle" was later in 1903, and finally in 1926, the Augustiner Festhalle was erected for the first time.  The original tent featured a tower, which was later removed from the construction design during the years 1949-2010. The tower was reinstated in 2010 in celebration of the 200th anniversary of the Oktoberfest, and has continued to be a feature of the Festhalle to this day.  Since 1987, Augustiner is the only brewery of the 6 featured at Oktoberfest, to exclusively pour from their wooden barrels.

Distribution and marketing 
Augustiner beer is normally found within the Greater Munich area, but in the last few years it has become popular outside Munich, for example in Berlin, where it is one of the most successful beers in Mitte, even though the company does not advertise. When most German breweries updated their bottles to a slim and more modern design to give their beer a more classy and less old fashioned appearance, Augustiner stuck with its original "classic" form, often nicknamed the "Bauarbeiterhalbe" (construction worker's half litre). The labels have also not changed in over 20 years. The success of the brand has been attributed to the traditional "retro" image it enjoys as one of the last major breweries in Munich that is not owned by an international beer conglomerate; Augustiner-Bräu is 51%-owned by a charitable foundation.

Augustiner-Bräu operates a beer tent at the Oktoberfest, as well as owning one of Munich's largest beer gardens, the Augustiner-Keller at Arnulfstraße 52, and several traditional bars throughout the city.

It is imported into United States by Global Village Imports, LLC. of King of Prussia, PA.  Since distribution is very limited, only Augustiner Edelstoff and Maximator are available.

Beers 
 Augustiner's most popular beer is Augustiner Lagerbier Hell (5.2%), a pale lager that is given a prolonged secondary fermentation.
 Edelstoff is a slightly brighter, slightly sweeter, more sparkly, and stronger (5.6%) lager. In America Edelstoff is 5.7% alcohol content
 Augustiner Dunkel, a malty dark beer.
 Augustiner Pils, brewed according to the original Pilsner recipe.
 Augustiner Weißbier.
 Oktoberfestbier (6.3%), a style of beer known as Märzen in German, specially brewed for the Oktoberfest.  Augustiner′s Oktoberfest beer and Edelstoff are the only beers at the festival that are still served from traditional wooden barrels.
 Maximator, a Doppelbock and, like the Oktoberfestbier, seasonal.  Brewed to coincide with Lent, this is a starkbier (strong beer, 7.5%).
 Heller Bock, a well lagered pale, seasonal beer (7.2%), only available in May and June in Munich.
All of Augustiner′s brands are brewed in accordance with the Reinheitsgebot. This means the ingredients of the beer are just four: water, grain (barley and or wheat), hops and yeast.

See also 

 Oktoberfest

References

External links 

 

Beer and breweries in Bavaria
Beer brands of Germany
Buildings and structures in Munich
Brewery companies of Munich
1328 establishments in Europe